Eshgaft-e Khorma (also Romanized as Eshgaft-e Khormā; also known as Eshkaft-e Khorma) is a village in Sardasht Rural District, Sardasht District, Dezful County, Khuzestan Province, Iran. At the 2006 census, its population was 67, in 10 families.

References 

Populated places in Dezful County